Truid Blaisse-Terwindt (4 April 1917 – 27 December 2002) was a Dutch female hockey- and tennis player who was active in the 1930s and 1940s. Between 1935 and 1948 she participated in five Wimbledon Championships. Her best result in the singles event was reaching the third round in 1937, losing to Dorothy Round, and 1948, losing to first seeded Margaret du Pont. In the doubles she reached the third round in 1936 and 1946 partnering compatriot Madzy Rollin Couquerque. With Ivo Rinkel she reached the fourth round of the mixed doubles in 1946.

In 1936 Terwindt became Dutch champion in the singles, doubles (partnering Madzy Rollin Couquerque) and mixed doubles (partnering Joop Knottenbelt) events. In 1937 she successfully defended her singles and doubles titles. In total she won 13 Dutch championship titles during her career.

In addition to tennis she was also active in field hockey. In 1931, at the age of 14, she joined the Amsterdamsche Hockey & Bandy Club (AH & BC) and directly became a member of the first team. With AH & BC she became national champion in 1937 and 1938 and made nine appearances for the Dutch national team. Her marriage in 1938 to Huib Blaisse brought an end to her hockey career.

References

1917 births
2002 deaths
Dutch female tennis players
Dutch female field hockey players
Sportspeople from Amsterdam
Amsterdamsche Hockey & Bandy Club players